The Overland Waterloo Company Building is a historic building located in Waterloo, Iowa, United States.  Built in 1916 by the Corn Belt Auto Company, the four-story, brick structure housed the Northeast Iowa distributorship for Willys-Overland Motors.  Designed by Waterloo architect Clinton P. Shockley, it features brick and terra cotta pilasters, terra cotta plaques with swag motif, molding, and a balconet.  The first floor housed the sales offices and a service garage. The second floor was occupied by a clubroom/lounge, a display room for used cars, a battery-charging room, a workroom, stockroom, shop and employees' room. The third and fourth floors were used to store automobiles to be delivered to dealers and customers. Corn Belt lost their distributorship by way of a corporate restructuring in 1921, but maintained an Overland dealership here until 1927 when they moved to a different building.  The building housed other automobile related business until 1955.  In that year KWWL radio and KWWL-TV moved into the main floor and other businesses occupied the other floors.  Black Hawk Broadcasting Company, which owned the stations, converted the entire building for use as a broadcast facility in 1965.  The building continues to function for that purpose.  It was listed on the National Register of Historic Places in 2014.

References

Commercial buildings completed in 1916
Buildings and structures in Waterloo, Iowa
National Register of Historic Places in Black Hawk County, Iowa
Commercial buildings on the National Register of Historic Places in Iowa
Neoclassical architecture in Iowa